Weerahela Grama Niladhari Division is a Grama Niladhari Division of the Thissamaharama Divisional Secretariat  of Hambantota District  of Southern Province, Sri Lanka .  It has Grama Niladhari Division Code 44.

Weerahela is a surrounded by the Saliyapura, Jayagama, Saddhathissapura New Town, Saddhathissapura, Saddhathissapura, Mahasenpura and Joolpallama  Grama Niladhari Divisions.

Demographics

Ethnicity 

The Weerahela Grama Niladhari Division has a Sinhalese majority (94.9%) . In comparison, the Thissamaharama Divisional Secretariat (which contains the Weerahela Grama Niladhari Division) has a Sinhalese majority (96.6%)

Religion 

The Weerahela Grama Niladhari Division has a Buddhist majority (97.3%) . In comparison, the Thissamaharama Divisional Secretariat (which contains the Weerahela Grama Niladhari Division) has a Buddhist majority (96.0%)

Grama Niladhari Divisions of Thissamaharama Divisional Secretariat

References